Kiril Yuriyovych Popov (born 1 May 2003) is a Ukrainian professional footballer who plays for Kolos Kovalivka, on loan from Dynamo Kyiv.

Club career 
Popov made his professional debut for Dynamo Kyiv on the 24 November 2020, coming on as a substitute for Oleksandr Karavayev in a 2019–20 UEFA Champions League match against Barcelona.

References

External links

 
 

2003 births
Living people
Footballers from Nizhyn
Ukrainian footballers
Association football forwards
Ukraine youth international footballers
FC Dynamo Kyiv players
FC Kolos Kovalivka players
Ukrainian Premier League players